The 11th constituency of Seine-et-Marne is a French legislative constituency in the Seine-et-Marne département.

Description

The 11th constituency of Seine-et-Marne was created as a result of the 2010 redistricting of French legislative constituencies in which Seine-et-Marne gained two additional constituencies. The seat is a combination of territory from the old 1st and 9th constituencies.

Historic representation

Election results

2022

 
 
 
 
 
 
 
|-
| colspan="8" bgcolor="#E9E9E9"|
|-

2017

 
 
 
 
 
 
|-
| colspan="8" bgcolor="#E9E9E9"|
|-

2012

Sources

Official results of French elections from 2002: "Résultats électoraux officiels en France" (in French).

11